"Do You Know What I Mean" is a song written and performed by Lee Michaels.  It was produced by Michaels.

It reached #6 on the U.S. Billboard Hot 100 and #4 on the Cash Box Top 100 in the summer of 1971.  The song was featured on his 1971 album, 5th.
The single ranked #19 on Billboard's Year-End Hot 100 singles of 1971.

Background
The song is about the fact that he saw his ex-girlfriend having an affair with his best friend. He asks her if she still cares for him, to which she replies, in a spoken voice, that he had not expressed his love for her for "nearly" 4 years, and this has been very painful for her. He may now understand how she has been feeling, but it is too late; she tells him he had better find someone new.

Chart performance

Weekly charts

Year-end charts

Renée Geyer version

Australian musician Renée Geyer recorded a version in 1981. The song was released in October 1981 as the second single from her seventh studio album, So Lucky. The song peaked at #29 on the Australian Kent Music Report and in New Zealand.

Track listing
 Australian 7" Single
Side A "Do You Know What I Mean" - 3:20	
Side B "Good Lovin'" - 3:34

Charts

Other versions
 Simon Turner, on his 1973 album, Simon Turner.
 Gwen McCrae, as a single in 1984 which reached #83 on the U.S. R&B chart.
 Myles Goodwyn - featuring Lee Aaron - as a single in 1988; it reached #47 in Canada.  It was featured on his album, Myles Goodwyn.
 Kevin Naquin and the Ossun Playboys on the 2014 album, No Guarantee.

References

1971 songs
1971 singles
1981 singles
1984 singles
1988 singles
Lee Michaels songs
Renée Geyer songs
Gwen McCrae songs
A&M Records singles
Mushroom Records singles
Atlantic Records singles